may refer to:

Inukami District, Shiga
Inukami!, light novel series by Mamizu Arisawa that was adapted into a manga and anime series
Inugami, a mythological Japanese creature
Inugami (manga), manga series by Masaya Hokazono
Inugami Korone, a virtual YouTuber affiliated with Hololive Production